The National Book Critics Circle (NBCC) is an American nonprofit organization (501(c)(3)) with more than 700 members. It is the professional association of American book review editors and critics, known primarily for the National Book Critics Circle Awards, a set of literary awards presented every March.

The organization was founded April 1974 in New York City by "John Leonard, Nona Balakian, and Ivan Sandrof intending to extend the Algonquin round table to a national conversation".

It was formally chartered October 1974 as a New York state non-profit corporation and the Advisory Board voted in November to establish annual literary awards.

In the first newsletter three months later, President Ivan Sandrof proclaimed the primary purpose "to improve and maintain the standards of literary criticism in an era of diminishing and deteriorating values". At that time there were 140 members, with outreach to freelance critics planned for that year.

NBCC first presented its Awards in January 1976 to books published during 1975 in four categories.

Only active review editors and reviewers may be voting members; they elect the 24 Directors who formally make nominations and alone make final selections each year.

A fifth award category for books (Autobiography/Biography) was added for 1983 and divided in two for 2005. Since 2005 there are eight awards. Six National Book Critics Circle Awards recognize "best books" published in the United States during the preceding year in six categories: fiction, nonfiction, autobiography, biography, criticism, and poetry.
Annually "the most accomplished reviewer" among its members is recognized by the Nona Balakian Citation for Excellence in Reviewing (from 1991).

The NBCC also recognizes no more than one person or organization for "exceptional contributions to books" with the Ivan Sandrof Lifetime Achievement Award (from 1981 under more than one name).All eight awards are officially dated in the preceding year.

As a professional association, NBCC also works to improve the quality of reviews and provides services to its members.

Controversies 
In 2020, more than half of the 24 board members resigned over conflicting views on how to address perceived racial disparities both on the board, and within the industry they represent.  This demonstrative revolt has also been attributed to breaches in confidentiality stemming from leaked emails, and the dismissive, antagonistic communication style of a long-standing board member, Carlin Romano, whom half the board members describe as a bully.  Overall, the mass resignations amount to a controversy seen as part of an industry-wide reckoning concerning the lack of diversity in publishing  and literary awards.

First Board of Directors (1975) 
President Ivan Sandrof, The Worcester Telegram-Gazette

Vice President Digby Diehl, Los Angeles Times

Secretary Nona Balakian, The New York Times Book Review

Treasurer Susan Heath, The Saturday Review

Barbara A. Bannon, Publishers Weekly

John Barkham, John Barkham Reviews

Alvin Beam, Cleveland Plain Dealer

Alice Cromie, Freelance Critic

Martha Duffy, Time

Eliot Fremont-Smith, The Village Voice

Elizabeth Hardwick, New York Review of Books

Herbert A. Kenny, Freelance Critic

John Leonard, The New York Times Book Review

Thorpe Menn, The Kansas City Star

Stanton Peckham, Denver Post

Peter S. Prescott, Newsweek

Larry Swindell, Philadelphia Inquirer

Jonathan Yardley, Miami Herald

Past Presidents 

1974-1976:   Ivan Sandrof, Worcester Telegram-Gazette

1976-1982:   Eliot Fremont-Smith, Village Voice

1982-1984:   Richard Locke, Vanity Fair

1984-1986:    Brigitte Weeks, The Washington Post Book World

1986-1990:    Nina King, Newsday

1990-1992:    Jack Miles, Los Angeles Times

1992-1994     Herbert Liebowitz, Parnassus

1994-1996     Carlin Romano, Philadelphia Inquirer

1996-1998      Art Winslow, The Nation

1998-2000      Barbara Hoffert, Library Journal

2001-2004      Elizabeth Taylor, Chicago Tribune

2004-2006       Rebecca T. Miller, Library Journal

2006-2008       John Freeman, Freelance Critic

2008-2011       Jane Ciabattari, Freelance Critic

2011-2013       Eric Banks, Bookforum

2013-2015       Laurie Muchnick, Bloomberg News

2015-2017       Tom Beer, Newsday

2017-2019       Kate Tuttle, Boston Globe

2019-2020       Laurie Hertzel, Minneapolis Star Tribune

2020-2020:      Jane Ciabattari, Freelance Critic (acting)

2020–2022:              David Varno, Publishers Weekly

2022-Present:           Megan Labrise

References

External links 
 
How National Book Critics Circle Chooses Its Awards, by NBCC President Jane Ciabattari, The Daily Beast, January 22, 2011.

Literary criticism
Critics associations
Professional associations based in the United States
Organizations established in 1974
501(c)(3) organizations
1974 establishments in New York City
Algonquin Round Table